Fond du Lac River may refer to:

Fond du Lac River (Saskatchewan), northwestern Canada
Fond du Lac River (Wisconsin), United States